The Spy's Defeat is a 1913 silent film drama short directed by Harry McRae Webster and starring Francis X. Bushman and Ruth Stonehouse. It was produced by the Essanay Film Manufacturing Company and released by the General Film Company.

Cast
Francis X. Bushman - Lt. Carl Heinrich
Ruth Stonehouse - Fredericka
Frank Dayton - Count Plentoff, The Spy
Lillian Drew - Olga
William Walters - Von Metzing, The Russian
Bryant Washburn

See also
Francis X. Bushman filmography

References

External links
The Spy's Defeat at IMDb.com

1913 films
American silent short films
Essanay Studios films
American black-and-white films
Lost American films
Silent American drama films
1913 drama films
1910s American films
1910s English-language films